The Twenty-Six Point Program of the Falange, originally the Twenty-Seven Point Program of the Falange, is a manifesto that was written by José Antonio Primo de Rivera in September 1934. It served as a guiding document for the Falange Española political organization founded by Rivera in October 1933, as well as for its successor, the Falange Española de las Juntas de Ofensiva Nacional Sindicalista (FE de las JONS).

The manifesto is divided into six sections: "Nation, Unity, and Empire"; "State, Individual, Liberty"; "Economy, Labor, Class Struggle"; "Land"; "National Education and Religion"; and "National Revolution." Its content focuses on expanding the Spanish Empire, rejecting Marxism, agricultural reclamation of the countryside, and maintaining Catholicism.

During the 1937 merger of FE de las JONS with the Traditionalist Communion movement, Francisco Franco purged the original document's twenty-seventh point mandating that the Falange maintain dominance in any partnership. The new organization, abbreviated as FET y de las JONS, maintained the Twenty-Six Point Program of the Falange until its 1958 rebranding as the Movimiento Nacional with a guiding "Doctrine of the Movement" written the same year.

References 

Spanish literature
Francoist Spain
Falangism
Falangist works
Far-right politics in Spain